Geraldo José Pegado (born 23 November 1954) is a Brazilian sprinter. He competed in the men's 400 metres at the 1980 Summer Olympics. He was eliminated in round one when he came last in heat seven.

References

1954 births
Living people
Athletes (track and field) at the 1980 Summer Olympics
Brazilian male sprinters
Olympic athletes of Brazil
Place of birth missing (living people)